Almash (Almaş) is a rural locality (a village) in Bazgiyevsky Selsoviet, Sharansky District, Bashkortostan, Russia. The population was 18 as of 2010. There are 6 streets.

Geography 
Almash is located 19 km southeast of Sharan (the district's administrative centre) by road. Novy Tamyan is the nearest rural locality.

References 

Rural localities in Sharansky District